Augrabies  is a small town in the Northern Cape province of South Africa, situated on the south bank of the Orange River about  downstream from Upington. It is located on the R359 road just outside the Augrabies Falls National Park, which contains the Augrabies Falls for which the town is named.

References

Populated places in the Kai !Garib Local Municipality